Merrywood Grammar School was a grammar school in Knowle, Bristol. It opened in 1937 and closed in 1995. Its site now houses Knowle West Health Park.

References

Educational institutions established in 1932
Defunct schools in Bristol
Educational institutions disestablished in 2000
1932 establishments in England